Swami Satyabhakta (born as Darbarilal; 10 November 1899 – 10 December 1998) was an Indian scholar, philosopher, reformer and the founder of  Satya Samaj.

Early life 
Born Mulchanda at Shahpur, Sagar, he moved to Damoh to his aunt's house after the death of his mother at age 4, where he was renamed Darbarilal. He met Ganeshprasad Varni at Damoh and influenced by him, he joined the pathshala established by Varniji at Sagar. At age 19, he graduated with the title Nyayatirth and became a teacher at Sdyavad Vdyalaya at Varanasi for a year. He then moved to Seoni and then Indore, where he developed his rationalistic principles.

In 1923, he became a reformer. He lived in Bombay during 1926-1936, where he edited Jain Jagat and Jain Prakash. He started writing a series of articles that were later compiled into Jain Dharma Samiksha. He eventually moved to Wardha in 1936 and established his Ashrama there.

Works 

He was a prolific author. His writings include Buddhahridayam, Jain Dharma Mimansa, Mahavira Ka Antahsthal, Manav Bhasha,  Meri Africa Yatra, Anmol Patra etc. Swamiji worked hard to evolve in 1945-46 the new language which swamiji called Manav Bhasa of which grammar is complete and having no exceptions and very simple and can be learn in a month. "Aditi" of Sri Aurobindo Ashram wrote four pages about Manavbhasha. Swamiji compare Manavbhasha with Esperanto another language by Zamenhof a Polish Eye Surgen in 1887 and a book named  Esperanto verses Manav Bhasha was published in 1971.

His early work was published as Darbarilal Nyayatirtha (as an orthodox Jain scholar)  Darbarilal Satyabhakta during the transitional period. He contested against Zakir Hussain in the 1967 Indian presidential election but failed to win any votes.

He composed a complete library of texts include three volumes of Satyamrita or Manava Dharmashastra. They include  Drishti Kanda, a text on philosophy; Achara Kanda, a treatise on conduct of advanced individuals, analogous to Jain Acharnaga; and Vyavahara Kanda, on which is analogous to  Dharma Shastra of Manu or Shravakacharas in the Jain tradition.  He also composed a set of prayers towards Satyar deities, published as Satya Sangita.  He wrote a text Nirativada on social economics, that advocated an economic system that avoids the extremes of Marxism and Capitalism. His Vivaha Paddhati formulates a new form of marriage based on the traditional ceremony.

Satya Samaj 

The religious/philosophical movement Satya Samaj founded by him in 1934 and is active in several regions of India  and UK. Satya Samaj organizes yearly conventions.

Swami Satyabhakta established a Satya Mandir temple  at Vardha with a new pantheon that includes Lord Satya (truth) as the father and Goddess Ahimsa (non-violence) as the mother. While her right hand in the abhaya mudra, she hold a club in her left hand, symbolising that bravery is needed to preserve peace. The altar also has 8 images of the prophets belonging to various religious traditions, including Zoroaster and Karl Marx.

Influence

He was an early rationalistic syncretic philosopher. Osho has described meeting him and discussing on establishing a new religious order
While he was in Bombay, he was a friend of both Nathuram Premi and Sukhlal Sanghvi known for their open minded perspective.

Footnotes

External links 
 

1899 births
1998 deaths
Scholars from Madhya Pradesh
Indian autobiographers
Indian social reformers
Scholars of Jainism
Indian spiritual teachers
People from Sagar district
Religious pluralism
People from Wardha district